Szilárd Kovács (born 25 June 1991, in Miskolc) is a Hungarian football player who currently plays for Diósgyőri VTK.

References
Profile at HLSZ

1991 births
Living people
Sportspeople from Miskolc
Hungarian footballers
Association football midfielders
Diósgyőri VTK players